Yates Field House is a recreation and intramural sports complex at Georgetown University in Washington, D.C. It was built in the late 1970s largely underground, on the site of the university's football stadium, with a replacement AstroTurf field installed on top of it.

The four-level, 142,000-square foot facility includes several racket courts, basketball courts, a 200-meter jogging track and 25-meter, eight-lane indoor swimming pool, along with exercise rooms, weight rooms, locker rooms, saunas and a half-acre dance area. The facility was named for the Rev. Gerard F. Yates, a Georgetown faculty member.

Problems with the unusual roof arrangement — including torn artificial turf, pooling rainwater and interior leaks — have led to major renovations in 1987, 2002 and 2019, and periodic calls for Yates to be replaced. Because of problems with the playing surface, varsity teams have not used the rooftop Kehoe Field since 2002, and even intramural and recreational users were barred from the roof in 2016.

Construction 
In the mid-1970s, Georgetown sought to expand student and faculty opportunities for recreation, training and fitness, and relieve overcrowding on the varsity sports fields and at McDonough Gymnasium. Planners found it difficult to find the space on campus, or acquire new land adjacent to campus, that they would need for such a large facility.  

The solution was to dig up Kehoe Field, the varsity football stadium on campus, and build the field house underneath. While under construction, Yates was known on campus as the "Rec-Plex". In addition to saving the cost buying land for a campus expansion, the underground location was also projected to cost 30% less to heat and cool than an aboveground structure.

Kehoe Field had hosted varsity and intramural sports at Georgetown since 1956. During the construction, the football team played its 1977 and 1978 home games in the outfield of the baseball field, in a natural bowl on the present-day site of the Georgetown business school's Rafik B. Hariri Building.

After two years of construction, the $7.5 million fieldhouse opened July 30, 1979, eight months behind schedule. The rooftop football field, which retained the name Kehoe Field, was ready in time for the 1979 season.

Renovations 
By the time the facility was a decade old, roof problems were already commonplace. Rainwater did not drain properly, resulting in the need for $1.8 million in repairs in 1987 and $7 million in repairs in 2002. The Hoyas were forced to move most of their scheduled home games of the 1990 season to opponents' sites, as the university struggled to repair bubbling and cracking in the 400-meter outdoor running track that surrounded the football field. 

For the 2002 season, the football team moved to what was then Georgetown's soccer stadium, Harbin Field, ending Kehoe Field's use for varsity sports. Harbin Field was later redeveloped into what is now known as Cooper Field.

Kehoe Field continued to be used as the home of intramural and club sports until 2016, when a recurrence of the longstanding drainage problems led to the outdoor facility again being deemed unsafe, forcing Georgetown student groups to rent off-campus fields. In 2018, the university unveiled plans to restore Kehoe Field as an intramural sports field and recreation area.

References

Georgetown Hoyas
Georgetown University buildings
Sports venues completed in 1979
Athletics (track and field) venues in Washington, D.C.
College indoor track and field venues in the United States
Basketball venues in Washington, D.C.
Swimming venues in Washington, D.C.
College swimming venues in the United States
Tennis venues in Washington, D.C.
College tennis venues in the United States
1979 establishments in Washington, D.C.